The 1968 North Dakota State Bison football team was an American football team that represented North Dakota State University as a member of the North Central Conference (NCC) during the 1968 NCAA College Division football season. In their third season under head coach Ron Erhardt, the team compiled a 10–0 record (6–0 against conference opponents), won the conference championship, and defeated Arkansas State in the Pecan Bowl. The team was ranked No. 1 in the 1968 AP small college poll. The 1968 season was part of an unbeaten streak that lasted from the team's defeat in the 1967 Pecan Bowl until October 16, 1971.

Schedule

References

North Dakota State
North Dakota State Bison football seasons
NCAA Small College Football Champions
North Central Conference football champion seasons
College football undefeated seasons
North Dakota State Bison football